Mountford may refer to:

People:
James Mountford Allen (1809–1883), British architect
William Fowler Mountford Copeland II, horticulturist
Adam Mountford, producer of Test Match Special, a British radio programme covering professional cricket
Bill Mountford (fl.), New Zealand rugby league footballer who represented New Zealand
Bob Mountford (1952–2008), English footballer
Carolyn Mountford, Australian researcher specializing in magnetic resonance spectroscopic imaging
Cecil Mountford MBE (1919–2009), New Zealand rugby league footballer and coach
Charles H. Mountford, Stratford poet and humorist
Charles P. Mountford (1890–1976), Australian anthropologist and photographer
Declan Mountford (born 1997), former professional Australian rules footballer
Derek Mountford (born 1934), English former footballer
Edward William Mountford (1855–1908), English architect who designed the Old Bailey
Frank Mountford (1923–2006), English footballer
Garry Mountford (born 1983), Scottish rugby union player who plays for Stirling County
George Mountford, English footballer
George Mountford (footballer born 1921) (1921–1973), English footballer
Guy Mountford (1905–2003), English advertising executive, amateur ornithologist and conservationist
Harry Mountford (born 1886), English footballer
James Mountford, 19th century footballer
John Mountford (broadcaster) (born 1949), British television executive and former broadcaster
John Mountford (politician) (born 1933), Australian politician
Kali Mountford (born 1954), British Labour Party politician, MP for Colne Valley from 1997 to 2010
Ken Mountford, New Zealand rugby league player who represented his country
Lori Mountford (born 1959), American curler
Margaret Mountford, a British lawyer, businesswoman and TV personality known for her role in The Apprentice
Peter Mountford (author) (born 1976), American novelist and writer of short stories and non-fiction
Peter Mountford (cricketer) (born 1940), English cricketer
Peter Mountford (footballer) (born 1960), English footballer
Reg Mountford (born 1908), professional footballer
Sean Mountford (born 1988), English footballer
Simon Mountford (died 1537/38) (1487–1537), English politician
Sir Simon Mountford, English MP, executed for rebelling again the king
Tim Mountford (born 1946), former American cyclist
William Mountford (1816–1885), English Unitarian preacher and author
Roy Mountford Vale (1912–1977), Australian politician
Mountford Tosswill Woollaston (1910–1998), New Zealand painter

Places:
Wellesbourne Mountford large village and civil parish in the county of Warwickshire, UK

Other:
Mountford Expedition or 1948 American-Australian Scientific Expedition to Arnhem Land
Street v Mountford UKHL 4 is an important House of Lords judgment in English property law

See also
Montford (disambiguation)
Montfort (disambiguation)
Mountford family
Mountfort surname page
Munford (disambiguation)